John Vaughan may refer to:

Gentry
John Vaughan, 1st Earl of Carbery (1574/75–1634), Welsh courtier and MP for Carmarthenshire 1601, 1621
John Vaughan, 3rd Earl of Carbery (1639–1713), Governor of Jamaica and President of the Royal Society, MP for Carmarthen 1661 and Carmarthenshire 1679–86
John Vaughan, 1st Viscount Lisburne (1667–1721)
John Vaughan, 2nd Viscount Lisburne (1695–1741), MP for Cardiganshire 1727–34
John Vaughan, 3rd Earl of Lisburne (1769–1831), MP for Cardigan 1796–1818
Sir John Vaughan (puisne judge) (1768–1839), baron of the Exchequer and justice of the Common Pleas
John Vaughan, 8th Earl of Lisburne (1918–2014)

Military
Sir John Vaughan (governor) (d.1643), army officer and military governor of Derry 1611–1643, and MP for County Donegal in 1613 and 1634
John Vaughan (British Army officer, born 1871) (1871–1956), British cavalry officer commanded the 3rd Cavalry Division in the First World War
Sir John Vaughan (British Army officer, died 1795) (c. 1731–1795), British army officer and Member of Parliament for Berwick-upon-Tweed 1774–95
John Vaughan (East India Company officer) (1778–1830), British East India Company army officer

Law and politics
John Vaughan (died 1577), MP for Herefordshire, Horsham, Surrey, Petersfield, Bletchingley, Hedon, Northumberland, Dartmouth and Grantham
John Vaughan (died 1574), MP for Carmarthen Boroughs, 1558 and Carmarthenshire, 1572 
John Vaughan (by 1553-97 or later), MP for Pembroke 1594, 1586
Sir John Vaughan (chief justice) (1603–1674), MP for Cardigan 1628–45 and Cardiganshire 1661–68, Chief Justice of Common Pleas
John Vaughan (MP for Montgomery) (c. 1654–c. 1713), MP for Montgomery 1701–05
John Vaughan (1693–1765), MP for Carmarthenshire 1745–54
John Vaughan (died 1804) (c. 1752–1804) of Golden Grove, Carmarthenshire, MP for Carmarthenshire, 1779–1804
John Vaughan (Australian politician) (1879–1955), Attorney-General of South Australia
John Vaughan (ironmaster) (1799–1868), 19th century British ironmaster and mayor of Middlesbrough
 John Vaughan (MP for Merioneth), Welsh politician who sat in the House of Commons in 1654
John Henry Vaughan (1892–1965), lawyer and ornithologist; Attorney General of Zanzibar and later of Fiji

Sportsmen
John Vaughan (footballer, born 1856) (1856–1935), Welsh international footballer
John Owen Vaughan (1863–1952), Welsh international footballer
John Vaughan (cricketer) (born 1945), Canadian cricketer
John Vaughan (footballer, born 1964), English football goalkeeper with Fulham, Cambridge United, Preston North End, Lincoln City and others

Other
John Vaughan (wine merchant) (1756–1841), treasurer and librarian of the American Philosophical Society
John Vaughan (architect), American architect active in 1891 in Salt Lake City, Utah
John Vaughan (plant scientist) (1926–2005), British food scientist
John Vaughan (bishop) (1853–1925), English Catholic bishop
Johnny Vaughan (born 1966), English broadcaster and journalist
John Vaughan (Canon of Windsor) (died 1499), Canon of Windsor
John Vaughan (naturalist) (1855–1922), Canon of Winchester, rector of Droxford and naturalist
Jon the Dentist,  British music record producer

See also
Jack Vaughan (disambiguation)
John Vaughn (disambiguation)